The Rural Industry Promotions Company Workers' Union (RIPCWU) is a trade union affiliate of the Botswana Federation of Trade Unions in Botswana.

References

Botswana Federation of Trade Unions
Trade unions in Botswana